A list of books and essays about Robert Bresson:

 Cardullo, Bert, ed. The Films of Robert Bresson: A Casebook. Anthem Press, 2009. 
 Cunneen, Joseph. Robert Bresson: A Spiritual Style in Film. Continuum, 2004. 
 Price, Brian. Neither God Nor Master: Robert Bresson and Radical Politics, University of Minnesota Press, 2011. 
 Reader, Keith. Robert Bresson. Manchester University Press. 
 Quandt, James. Robert Bresson, Revised TIFF Cinematheque, 2011 

Bresson
Bibliography